Sâncraiu (Kalotaszentkirály in Hungarian) is a commune in Cluj County, Transylvania, Romania. 

Villages
The commune is composed of five villages: Alunișu (Magyarókereke), Domoșu (Kalotadámos), Brăișoru (Malomszeg), Horlacea (Jákótelke) and Sâncraiu.

Horlacea
Horlacea is a small village located in the commune of Sâncraiu. It has a population of 177 people (2002).  Horlacea has no paved roads or scheduled railway service, and consequently provides a very rustic agritourism experience. It is an isolated settlement in the Apuseni Mountains, in the heart of Transylvania. The closest town is Huedin.

At the 2011 census, 78.4% of inhabitants were Hungarians and 20.3% Romanians.

Natives
Sándor Keresztes (1919–2013), Hungarian diplomat and jurist

References

Atlasul localităților județului Cluj (Cluj County Localities Atlas), Suncart Publishing House, Cluj-Napoca

External links

  Administrative map of the county

Communes in Cluj County
Localities in Transylvania